Charles Angina (born 29 March 1962) is a lieutenant general in the Uganda People's Defense Force (UPDF). As of August 2021, he is awaiting assignment at the Uganda Ministry of Foreign Affairs.
Before that, from 2016 until July 2021, he served as the deputy chief coordinator of Operation Wealth Creation (OWC), a development program operated by the Ugandan military.

He previously served as the Deputy Chief of Defense Forces of Uganda , the second-highest military position within the UPDF. He was appointed to that position in May 2013, replacing General Ivan Koreta, who was appointed an ambassador.

History
He was born in Bukedea District, Teso sub-region, in the Eastern Region of Uganda.

Military training
Angina joined the UPDF in 1983. Following a one-year officer cadet course, he was commissioned in 1985. He attended several military courses, including:

1. National Defense Course, China in 1998

2. Command and General Staff Course (CGSC), in the United States in 2000

3. Course on Military and Media in a Democracy, at the University of Kansas in 2000

4. Joint Tactical Command Course, in China

5. Combined Platoon Commander Course, in North Korea.

Military career
Early in his military career, he served as an Aide de Camp. He went on to serve as an Intelligence Officer, Platoon Commander, Operational Intelligence Officer Combined Mobile Forces and as 4th Division Intelligence Officer. From there, he served as Operations Coordinator 2nd Division, then he served as the 305th Brigade Commander and as Commander of the 2nd Division, after that.

During the Ituri conflict, Angina served as the sector commander of the Ituri region in the Democratic Republic of the Congo (DRC). He then became sector commander Basankusu during Operation Safe Haven in the DRC.

From there he served a military adviser in Tanzania. He then transferred to the Embassy of Uganda in Washington, D. C. as the military attaché. He was then appointed chairman of the General Court Martial of the UPDF. He also has served as chief of staff of land forces in the UPDF.

Other responsibilities
He was a Member of Parliament, representing the UPDF in the 9th Parliament (2011 -2016). He served as a member of the parliamentary committee on privileges and discipline.

See also
 Crispus Kiyonga
 David Muhoozi
 Muhoozi Kainerugaba
 Samuel Turyagyenda
 Leopold Kyanda
 Wilson Mbadi
 Yoweri Museveni

References

External links
Brigadier Charles Angina Moved In New Army Reshuffle

1962 births
Living people
People from Bukedea District
Itesot people
Ugandan military personnel
Ituri conflict
People from Eastern Region, Uganda
People from Teso sub-region
Members of the Parliament of Uganda
Ugandan generals
21st-century Ugandan politicians